St. Andrews is an historical provincial electoral division in Manitoba, Canada.  It existed on two separate occasions, and was located to the immediate north of Winnipeg, the capital city.

St. Andrews (original constituency)
When Manitoba joined Canadian Confederation in 1870, the St. Andrews region of the province was given two seats: St. Andrews North and St. Andrews South.  It was consolidated into a single constituency following redistribution in 1879.  In 1899, it was merged with the Kildonan constituency and Kildonan and St. Andrews.

The St. Andrews electoral division was initially dominated by anglophone "old settlers", who had resided in the Red River territory before it was incorporated as a province.  Many of the old settlers were known as "mixed-bloods", referring to persons of British and aboriginal descent (the term was not considered offensive at the time).  John Norquay, a "mixed-blood" leader who served as Premier of Manitoba from 1878 to 1887, represented St. Andrews in the provincial legislature for many years.  Alfred Boyd, who is sometimes lists as Manitoba's first premier, also represented a St. Andrews constituency from 1870 to 1874.

Members of the Legislative Assembly for St. Andrews North

Members of the Legislative Assembly for St. Andrews South

Members of the Legislative Assembly for St. Andrews

St. Andrews (re-established constituency)
St. Andrews was re-established for the 1949 provincial election, when Kildonan and St. Andrews was eliminated through redistribution.  It was eliminated a second time in 1958.

The re-established constituency's first representative was James McLenaghen, who was a Progressive Conservative cabinet minister in a coalition government led by the Liberal-Progressives.  McLenaghen was a prominent defender of the coalition within his party, and his death in 1950 hastened its dissolution.  He was replaced by Thomas Hillhouse of the Liberal-Progressives.

Members of the Legislative Assembly for St. Andrews (1949-1958)

Election results (St. Andrews)

1879 general election

1883 general election

1886 general election

1888 general election

1892 general election

1896 general election

1949 general election

1950 by-election

1953 general election

Election results (St. Andrews North)

1870 general election

1874 general election

1878 general election

Election results (St. Andrews South)

1870 general election

1874 general election

1875 by-election

1878 general election 

Former provincial electoral districts of Manitoba